Ildze is a Latvian feminine given name. The name day of persons named Ildze is January 27.

Notable people named Ildze
Ildze Bortaščenoka (born 1987), Latvian athlete

References 

Latvian feminine given names
Feminine given names